Delias narses is a butterfly in the family Pieridae. It was described by Karl Borromaeus Maria Josef Heller in 1896. It is endemic to New Britain and New Ireland.

References

External links
 
 Delias at Markku Savela's Lepidoptera and Some Other Life Forms

narses
Butterflies described in 1896